Velichkin is a rural locality (a khutor) in Beloprudskoye Rural Settlement, Danilovsky District, Volgograd Oblast, Russia. The population was 184 as of 2010. There are 3 streets.

Geography 
Velichkin is located in steppe, 49 km north of Danilovka (the district's administrative centre) by road. Belye Prudy is the nearest rural locality.

References 

Rural localities in Danilovsky District, Volgograd Oblast